Lironobidae is a family of gastropods belonging to the order Littorinimorpha.

Genera:
 Attenuata Hedley, 1918
 Lironoba Iredale, 1915
 Merelina Iredale, 1915

References

 Ponder, W. F. (1967). The classification of the Rissoidae and Orbitestellidae with descriptions of some new taxa. Transactions of the Royal Society of New Zealand, Zoology. 9(17): 193-224, pls 1-13.

External links
 Criscione, F., Ponder, W. F., Köhler, F., Takano, T. & Kano, Y. (2017). A molecular phylogeny of Rissoidae (Caenogastropoda: Rissooidea) allows testing the diagnostic utility of morphological traits. Zoological Journal of the Linnean Society. 179 , 23–40.

Littorinimorpha